35 Squadron SAAF is a squadron of the South African Air Force. It is a maritime patrol and transport squadron.

History
The squadron was formed on 15 February 1945 when 262 Squadron Royal Air Force, an anti-submarine squadron, operating the Consolidated Catalina, was transferred to the South African Air Force.

Awards
 Award for Best Permanent Flying Unit in the SAAF for both 2004 and 2005
 Sword of Peace in 2013

Aircraft operated

Officer Commanding

References

Notes

Bibliography

 Halley, James J. The Squadrons of the Royal Air Force & Commonwealth 1918-1988. Tonbridge, Kent, UK: Air Britain (Historians) Ltd., 1988. .
 Jefford, C.G. RAF Squadrons, a Comprehensive record of the Movement and Equipment of all RAF Squadrons and their Antecedents since 1912. Shrewsbury, Shropshire, UK: Airlife Publishing, 1988 (second edition 2001). .
 Rawlings, John D.R. Coastal, Support and Special Squadrons of the RAF and their Aircraft. London: Jane's Publishing Company Ltd., 1982. .
 Spring, Ivan. Flying Boat: The History of 262 Squadron RAF and the origins of 35 Squadron SAAF. Johannesburg, South Africa: Spring Air, 1995. .

External links
 Squadron page at af.mil.za
 Squadron page at saairforce.co.za

Squadrons of the South African Air Force
Military units and formations in Cape Town
Military units and formations established in 1945